Christ Mbondi (born 2 February 1992) is a Cameroonian footballer who plays for FC San Pédro.

Career
He played in 2011 FIFA U-20 World Cup.

References

External links
 
 Christ Mbondi at Footballdatabase

1992 births
Living people
Cameroonian footballers
Cameroonian expatriate footballers
Cameroon under-20 international footballers
FC Sion players
Christ Mbondi
Christ Mbondi
JS Saoura players
Club Olimpia (Itá) players
Deportivo Capiatá players
Rayon Sports F.C. players
Swiss Super League players
Swiss Promotion League players
Algerian Ligue Professionnelle 1 players
Cameroonian expatriate sportspeople in Switzerland
Cameroonian expatriate sportspeople in Thailand
Cameroonian expatriate sportspeople in Paraguay
Cameroonian expatriate sportspeople in Algeria
Cameroonian expatriate sportspeople in Rwanda
Cameroonian expatriate sportspeople in Ivory Coast
Expatriate footballers in Switzerland
Expatriate footballers in Thailand
Expatriate footballers in Paraguay
Expatriate footballers in Algeria
Expatriate footballers in Rwanda
Expatriate footballers in Ivory Coast
Association football forwards
FC San-Pédro players